Jean-Paul Chanteguet (born 9 December 1949 in Le Blanc, Indre) was a member of the National Assembly of France from 1988 to 1993 and again from 1997 to 2017.  He represented the Indre department, first the 3rd and then the 1st constituency, was a member of the Socialiste, radical, citoyen et divers gauche and was particularly engaged on environmental issues.

References

1949 births
Living people
People from Le Blanc
Socialist Party (France) politicians
Deputies of the 12th National Assembly of the French Fifth Republic
Deputies of the 13th National Assembly of the French Fifth Republic
Deputies of the 14th National Assembly of the French Fifth Republic